Ernesto Ledesma (October 23, 1930, in Montevideo, Uruguay – January 19, 2011, in Montevideo, Uruguay) is a former Uruguayan footballer who played for clubs of Uruguay, Chile and Brazil.

Teams
  Peñarol 1950-1954
  Universidad de Chile 1955-1956
  Portuguesa 1957-1960
  Peñarol 1961
  Montevideo Wanderers 1962-1963
  Peñarol 1964-1966

Titles
  Peñarol 1953, 1954, 1961, 1964 and 1965 (Uruguayan League), 1961 (Copa Libertadores and Intercontinental Cup)

References
 Profile at BDFA 

1931 births
2011 deaths
Uruguayan footballers
Uruguayan expatriate footballers
Uruguay international footballers
Montevideo Wanderers F.C. players
Peñarol players
Universidad de Chile footballers
Chilean Primera División players
Expatriate footballers in Chile
Expatriate footballers in Brazil

Association football midfielders